The 1973 Salta earthquake  occurred in the Province of Salta, in the Republic of Argentina, at a depth of , on 19 November, with a magnitude of 5.6 on the  scale.

Damage and casualties
The destructive force of the 1973 Salta earthquake was measured at VII (Very strong) on the Mercalli intensity scale. It caused damage to communities towards the east of the provinces of Salta and Jujuy, particularly in Santa Clara (Jujuy).

See also
List of earthquakes in 1973
List of earthquakes in Argentina

References

1973
1973 earthquakes
1973
1973